The Èrsh language was the language of the Èr or Èrs people, hypothetical Nakh-speaking people argued for by Amjad Jaimoukha in his book The Chechens: A Handbook.

Examples of placenames
The capital of the Èrs (which was later turned into a fortress by Urartu) was called Èribuni (later turned into and used as a fortress by the Urartian state). Amjad Jaimoukha argued that "buni" is from a Nakh root, meaning 'shelter' or 'home' (giving rise to the modern Chechen word bun, 'a cabin, or small house'). According to him, Erebuni meant "the home of the Èrs". It corresponds to modern Yerevan. However, this theory is not accepted by mainstream linguists and is considered problematic, namely because Chechen "bun" initially derives from the Armenian word buyn (բույն) for "nest" or "lair", from Proto-Indo-European *bʰeuH-no-, from *bʰeuH- (“to be; to grow”). Cognates include Sanskrit भुवन (bhúvana, "world"),  Albanian bun ("shepherd's hut") and Middle Persian بن bun ("bottom"). 

In the Georgian Chronicles, Leonti Mroveli refers to Lake Sevan as "Lake Ereta". The name of the Arax is also attributed to the Èrs. It is also called the Yeraskhi. The Armenian name is "Yeraskhadzor" (which Jaimoukha identifies as Èr + khi, a Nakh water body suffix, + Armenian dzor gorge). However, according to Urartologist Paul Zimansky, Hurro-Urartian -khi is a plural/tribal denotation and not a hydronym, rendering Jaimoukha's theory incorrect.

References

Northeast Caucasian languages